Joe Palooka in Triple Cross is a 1951 American film. It was part of the Joe Palooka series and was directed by Reginald Le Borg.

Plot

After the champ, Joe Palooka, his wife Anne and trainer Knobby stop for gas, they pick up three hitchhikers who turn out to be fugitives from the law. Their leader is the Professor and his top henchman is Dutch, who is disguised as a woman.

While holding Ann hostage, the Professor orders Joe to lose his next fight on purpose while Knobby places a $100,000 bet on his foe. Dutch, carrying a gun, sits ringside, again dressed as a woman, to make sure Joe does what he's told.

Knocked out of the ring, Joe lands at Dutch's feet and exposes his true identity. While cops and security deal with that, Joe jumps back into the ring and flattens his opponent. He is winner and still champion.

Cast
 Joe Kirkwood, Jr. as Joe Palooka
 Cathy Downs as Anne
 James Gleason as Knobby
 John Emery as the Professor
 Steve Brodie as Dutch

External links

Joe Palooka in Triple Cross at TCMDB

1951 films
American black-and-white films
Films directed by Reginald Le Borg
Films based on American comics
Joe Palooka films
Films about hitchhiking